Trikala (Greek: Τρίκαλα) is a town in the eastern part of Imathia, Greece.  The town (2011 census population 1,415) is in the municipal unit of Platy. It is situated between the Aliakmon and Loudias rivers, southeast of Alexandreia.

Population

History
The origins of Trikala can be traced back to the late 18th century. The church of Agios Dimitrios (St. Demetrius) was built in 1750. The original name of the town, before the first refugees from Northern Thrace in Bulgaria arrived in 1925, was Karyes (meaning walnut trees), the current name, Trikala, means "thrice good".

Trikala was in Ottoman Empire until the Balkan Wars of 1913, afterwards, it became part of Greece. The majority of the population of Trikala to this day is made up by immigrants arriving from the Northern Thrace region of Bulgaria after a mutual population exchange between the two countries and their descendants. In 1935, Trikala saw an influx of Sarakatsani settlers. Some refugees from Pontus arrived before 1940.

Notable people

Sports 
 Dimitrios Itoudis, Basketball coach
 Dimitrios Manos, Football player
 Sokratis Dioudis, Football player
 Giorgos Koutsias, Football player

See also
List of settlements in Imathia

External links
Trikala on GTP Travel Pages

References

Populated places in Imathia